The 1982 Toyota Series Championships was a women's tennis tournament played on indoor carpet courts at the Byrne Meadowlands Arena in East Rutherford, New Jersey in the United States that was the season-ending tournament of the 1982 Toyota World Championship Series. It was the sixth and last edition of the tournament and was held from December 14 through December 19, 1982. The top 12 singles players and top 6 doubles teams, in terms of Toyota  Series ranking points, qualified for the event. First-seeded Martina Navratilova won the singles title and earned $75,000 first-prize money.

Finals

Singles

 Martina Navratilova defeated  Chris Evert-Lloyd 4–6, 6–1, 6–2
 It was Navratilova's 15th singles title of the year and the 70th of her career.

Doubles

 Martina Navratilova /  Pam Shriver defeated  Candy Reynolds /  Paula Smith 6–4, 7–5

Prize money 

Doubles prize money is per team.

See also
 Evert–Navratilova rivalry
 1982 Avon Championships

References

External links
 International Tennis Federation (ITF) tournament edition details

Virginia Slims of Washington
1982 in sports in New Jersey
Tennis tournaments in New Jersey
1982 in American tennis